The New Democratic Party of British Columbia (BC NDP) is a social-democratic provincial political party in British Columbia, Canada. It has governed the province since 2017.

The BC NDP is the British Columbia provincial arm of the federal New Democratic Party (NDP). The party previously governed from 1972 to 1975 and from 1991 to 2001. Following a hung parliament as a result of the 2017 election and the BC Liberal government's failure to win a confidence vote in the Legislature, the BC NDP secured a confidence and supply agreement with the BC Green Party to form a minority government. The party subsequently won a majority government after Premier John Horgan called a snap election in October 2020. The party gained 16 additional seats and the largest share of the popular vote in the party's history. In June 2022, Horgan announced that he would step down as party leader and premier once a successor had been chosen. David Eby was acclaimed as the party's new leader in the fourth quarter of 2022.

The party won the largest number of seats in three provincial elections, 1972, 1991 and 1996, but was reduced to two seats in the 2001 election before rebounding in 2005 and returning to government in 2017. Six leaders of the NDP have served as premier of British Columbia: Dave Barrett, Mike Harcourt, Glen Clark, Dan Miller, Ujjal Dosanjh, Horgan, and Eby.

History

Co-operative Commonwealth Federation (British Columbia section)
The party was formed in 1933, during the Great Depression, as the British Columbia section of the Co-operative Commonwealth Federation (CCF) by a coalition of the Socialist Party of Canada (SPC), the League for Social Reconstruction, and affiliated organizations. In August 1933, the latter two organizations merged to become the Associated CCF Clubs. The new party won seven seats in the 1933 provincial election, enough to form the official opposition. A further merger with the British Columbia SPC took place in 1935.

In 1936, the party split as its moderate leader, Reverend Robert Connell, was expelled over doctrinal differences in what was called the "Connell Affair". Three other CCF members of the Legislative Assembly (MLAs) in what had been a 7-member caucus quit and joined Connell in forming the Social Constructive Party, leaving only Harold Winch, Ernest Winch and Dorothy Steeves as CCF MLAs. The Constructivists nominated candidates in the 1937 election but failed to win a seat. The CCF regained their former contingent of seven MLAs but lost official opposition status to the reconstituted British Columbia Conservative Party.

Harold Winch succeeded Connell as CCF leader and guided the party until the 1950s.

The two-party system in Canada was challenged by the rise of the CCF and the Social Credit movement in western Canada during the Great Depression of the 1930s. The CCF first took power in 1944 in Saskatchewan under Premier Tommy Douglas. It also began to gain wider political support in British Columbia.

In order to block the rise of the CCF in BC, the provincial Liberal and Conservative parties formed a coalition government after the 1941 provincial election. That year neither party had enough seats to form a majority government on its own. For the ten years that the coalition held together, the CCF was the Official Opposition in the legislature.

Solidification as opposition party
After the coalition fell apart in 1951, the government introduced the alternative vote electoral system, allowing voters to make two choices. They expected that Conservative voters would list the Liberals as their second choice and vice versa. The government hoped to prevent the CCF from winning in a three-party competition, but they did not realize that a new fourth party was on the rise: the BC Social Credit League.

In the 1952 election, the Liberals and Conservatives were decimated. The Social Credit League was the main beneficiary of the new voting system: many non-CCF voters chose Social Credit as either their first or second choices. Social Credit emerged as the largest party, with one seat more than Winch's CCF. The Social Credit party chose a new leader, W. A. C. Bennett.

When Social Credit lost a motion of no confidence in the legislature in March 1953, Winch argued that the CCF should be allowed to try to form a government rather than the house being dissolved for an early election. The Liberals, however, refused to support the CCF's bid to form a government, and new elections were called.

In the 1953 election, Bennett won a majority government, and both the Liberal and the Conservative parties were reduced to fringe parties. Throughout the 1950s, Bennett's new electoral movement was able to keep the CCF at bay. This period coincided with the height of the Cold War, and Bennett effectively used the scare tactic of the "Red Menace" against the CCF, referring to them as the "socialist hordes".

Renaming
In 1960, the CCF joined with the Canadian Labour Congress nationally to create the New Party, which then in 1961 became the "New Democratic Party" (NDP). This reflected the formation of the national party from an alliance of the CCF and unions in the Canadian Labour Congress. Bennett managed to keep the CCF and the NDP out of power throughout the 1960s through four successive general elections. Each time, Bennett used the "Red Menace" tactic as a wedge issue against the NDP and its leaders: Robert Strachan and, in the 1969 general election, Thomas Berger.

Barrett government
The NDP first won election in 1972 under Dave Barrett, who served as premier for three years. The NDP passed a considerable amount of legislation in a short time, including establishing the Insurance Corporation of British Columbia and the Agricultural Land Reserve. A Question Period was added to the legislative process.

The NDP drove the small BC Liberal caucus to abandon their leader David Anderson for the Social Credit Party, as did one of the two Tories elected in 1972. The NDP introduced capital taxes and slashed funding to universities. It suffered for bringing clarity to the accounting by Social Credit, and revealing that BC was significantly in debt.

In the 1975 election, the Social Credit party, under W. A. C. Bennett's son Bill Bennett, won a snap election called by Barrett. The Barrett government had initiated a number of reforms in the areas of labour relations, the public service, and social programs. Most of these endured until the restraint budget of 1983.

The NDP peaked in popular support in the 1979 election with 46 percent of the vote. And after a minor decline in the party's vote share in 1983, Barrett retired as leader.

Riding high in the polls, the NDP appeared poised to win the 1986 election against the unpopular Social Credit government, but its new leader Bob Skelly stumbled in a verbal gaffe during the campaign, and the Socreds' new leader William Vander Zalm attracted votes with his charisma and telegenic performance. The party failed to score its anticipated breakthrough.

Harcourt government
The New Democratic Party governed BC for nine and a half years, winning two back-to-back general elections in 1991 and 1996 before being defeated in 2001. Although the party's majority was reduced in 1996, it triumphed over the divided remnants of the Social Credit Party. In 1991, due in part to Social Credit's scandals under Premier William Vander Zalm and in part to the stellar performance of British Columbia Liberal Party (BC Liberals) leader Gordon Wilson in debate, the old Social Credit vote split between the BC Liberals, which garnered 33 percent of the vote, and the Social Credit Party with 25 percent. The NDP, under the leadership of former Vancouver mayor Mike Harcourt, won with 41 percent of the popular vote, which was one percentage point lower than the share the party had lost with in 1986.

Harcourt's first two years in government were characterized by a notably social democratic policy agenda, which included increases in welfare spending and rates. In 1993, his government took a dramatic turn to the right with his televised address in which he lashed out against "welfare cheats, deadbeats and varmints". Broadcast province-wide, his speech inaugurated a set of welfare reforms enacted between 1993 and 1995; these were similar to those adopted by new Progressive Conservative provincial governments elected in Alberta and Ontario in the same time period.

The cutbacks were, in part, a reaction to a dramatic reduction in federal transfer payments by the federal Liberal government of Prime Minister Jean Chrétien. Parliament had repealed the Canada Assistance Plan bill of rights, which had included a right to food and a right to shelter. Unlike the reforms of the Harris and Klein governments in the other two provinces noted, the BC Benefits package of cutbacks and restrictions in social assistance eligibility was bundled with a childcare bonus paid to low- and medium-income families. The changes were unpopular with the province's anti-poverty movement and the BC Green Party; they were condemned by a motion at the NDP's 1997 convention.

Three months before BC Benefits was introduced by the Harcourt government, his government came into a protracted conflict with elements of the province's environmental movement. Harcourt's "Peace in the Woods" pact, which brought together traditionally warring environmental groups and forest workers' unions, began to collapse when Harcourt's cabinet exempted an environmentally sensitive area of Vancouver Island, Clayoquot Sound, from its province-wide mediation process for land-use conflicts, the Commission on Resources and the Environment (CORE). First Nations peoples led protests, including logging road blockades, which resulted in the arrests of more than 800 people. Some key environmental leaders, such as David Suzuki and Colleen McCrory, became alienated from the NDP and shifted their support to the Green Party in the 1996 provincial election.

Although low in the polls for much of his term in office, Harcourt and his newly appointed Attorney General Ujjal Dosanjh succeeded in regaining substantial public support by taking a hard line against an aboriginal group's occupation of a farmer's field in the Cariboo region of the province. In what became known as the Gustafsen Lake standoff, Dosanjh led the largest-scale police operation in British Columbia history as the government tried to regain control. The Royal Canadian Mounted Police (RCMP) used armoured vehicles provided by the Canadian military for protection. The military strongly rejected attempts by the RCMP to have them take over control of the situation, and ultimately it remained a police operation. The RCMP used anti-vehicle mines and shot thousands of rounds of ammunition at protesters.

With less than 72 hours before a planned election call, and with the NDP high in the polls for its hard line against welfare recipients and aboriginal and environmental radicals, the party's provincial office was raided by RCMP officers as part of an ongoing investigation of illegal use of charity bingo money by former provincial cabinet minister and MP Dave Stupich. Media called the scandal "Bingogate". Although Harcourt was not implicated in either the raid or the probe, he resigned; he was later fully exonerated. The NDP was led into the 1996 provincial general election by Glen Clark.

Clark years

Clark entered the 1996 election far back in the polls but proved an excellent campaigner. For the duration of the election, he re-unified the party's traditional coalition, using the slogan "On Your Side". He effectively portrayed the Liberals' new leader, former Vancouver mayor Gordon Campbell, as a pawn of big business and a dangerous right-wing extremist. Clark was aided by Jack Weisgerber, leader of the BC Reform Party (the name taken by the majority of the Social Credit caucus), and Wilson, by then leader of the Progressive Democratic Alliance (PDA). Although the NDP won only 39 percent of the vote to Campbell's 42 percent, it secured 39 seats to Campbell's 33.

Following the campaign, Clark's government struggled to exert leadership; the premier's scrappy style began to further alienate parts of the NDP coalition outside the core group of labour activists who had masterminded Clark's campaign. Shortly after the election, it was discovered that the 1995–96 and 1996–97 fiscal years did not have the balanced budgets on which Clark had campaigned but small deficits of approximately $100 million.

During these years, the NDP began to lose support and activists to the BC Greens, who reached 5 percent in the polls in the fourth quarter of 1997 and 11 percent by the fall of 1998. But most voters who left the NDP shifted to the Liberals.

New scandals surfaced. Clark allegedly used his influence to win a casino licence for a neighbour, Dimitrios Pilarinos, who had helped him with some home renovations. Construction of the PacifiCat BC Ferries suffered cost over-runs and poor technical decisions. The new ferries were intended to speed transportation between Vancouver and Nanaimo but became part of the fast ferry scandal.

By mid-1999, an obvious rift had appeared in the administration as Attorney General Dosanjh and Finance Minister Joy MacPhail challenged Clark's legitimacy. The party and province endured a few chaotic months of government with frequent cabinet shuffles following a police raid on Clark's home before the premier stepped aside. In 2002, Clark was acquitted of breach of trust and corruption charges in the Pilarinos case; Pilarinos was convicted of six charges.

Dan Miller, the longest-serving member of the legislature, stepped in as premier and interim party leader during an acrimonious leadership race between Dosanjh, maverick West Kootenay MLA Corky Evans, and Wilson, who had been persuaded to fold his stalled PDA in 1998 and join Clark's cabinet. Despite clear favouritism from Clark, Wilson finished last, with Dosanjh winning a majority of votes at the convention despite Evans winning the support of over two-thirds of the party's constituency associations.

Dosanjh's opposition leadership 
Having bottomed out at 15 percent in the polls, the Dosanjh government attempted to capitalize on the new premier's high personal approval rating with their remaining year in power. The government made a number of concessions to the party's anti-poverty and environmental wings in an attempt to reforge the coalition but the party would not budge in the polls. Halfway through his mandate, Dosanjh seemed to lose interest in governing and left for a lengthy tour of his native Punjab.

Dosanjh waited as long as possible to call the next election, finally doing so in April 2001. By this time, the party had risen to 21 percent in opinion polling – a slight improvement from the nadir of a year earlier. Nonetheless, it became obvious that the NDP would not be re-elected. Midway through the campaign, Dosanjh conceded defeat in a pre-recorded message and asked the electorate to give the NDP a chance as a strong opposition party. De facto leadership passed to MacPhail, who managed to reinvigorate the campaign. The NDP's popular vote dropped to 22 percent, while its seat count dropped to only two – MacPhail and neighbouring Vancouver-Mount Pleasant MLA Jenny Kwan. They were also the only surviving members of the previous Cabinet; even Dosanjh lost his seat. All 77 other seats were captured by the Liberals who won 58 percent of the vote. It was the second-worst defeat of a sitting provincial government in Canada. Despite the severe defeat, MacPhail was credited for saving the party from being completely wiped off the electoral map.

Shortly after the election, Dosanjh resigned as leader and MacPhail was appointed interim leader.

Opposition and recovery
MacPhail and Kwan were initially not granted official party status by Campbell on the grounds that the legislature's rules stipulated a party must hold four seats, though that claimed rule is not in the law and was widely panned in the media. However, the Speaker of the Assembly, former Social Credit cabinet minister-turned BC Liberal Claude Richmond, recognized MacPhail as leader of the Opposition. Ultimately, Richmond's position gradually won out, and he was able to ensure that the remains of the NDP were provided the resources of an official party.

Given the high level of support within the party for her leadership, MacPhail surprised many by choosing not to seek the full-time leadership in 2003. The low-key leadership campaign was contested by establishment favourite and former Victoria School Board chair Carole James, Oak Bay City Councillor Nils Jensen, former MLAs Leonard Krog and Steve Orcherton, and a few minor candidates. First ballot results had James first followed by Jensen, Krog, and Orcherton. James won on the second ballot.

In late 2004, the party won an upset election victory in the constituency of Surrey-Panorama Ridge. Jagrup Brar became the third member of the party's caucus, winning a riding that had supported the NDP in 1991 before falling to the Liberals in 1996. Brar beat a locally popular BC Liberal candidate and Adriane Carr, the BC Green Party's leader, winning an absolute majority of the vote.

In the 2005 provincial election, James came closer to forming a government than even the NDP had predicted, winning 33 seats to Campbell's 45 and receiving a vote share 5 percent higher in suburban Vancouver than any pollster had predicted. The NDP also exceeded 40 percent of the vote for the first time since 1991.

In 2008, the NDP won two key by-elections in Vancouver-Fairview and Vancouver-Burrard.

In the 2009 provincial election, the NDP came a close second to the Liberals, with 42 percent of the popular vote the Liberals 45 percent. 35 New Democrats were elected, while 49 Liberals were. Despite the popular vote, only 3,500 votes separated the party from forming government.

The NDP under Adrian Dix was widely expected to win the May 2013 provincial election as the NDP enjoyed a 20-point lead in the polls prior to the election campaign. However, the Liberals gained four seats, while the NDP lost two, in an election that returned the Liberal government under Premier Christy Clark. In September 2013, Dix announced his intention to resign as party leader once a leadership election was held.

Horgan and Eby governments

Following Dix's resignation, John Horgan, MLA for Langford-Juan de Fuca, was acclaimed as party leader in the 2014 party leadership election and subsequently became the leader of the Opposition in the Legislative Assembly of British Columbia.

In the May 2017 provincial election, the NDP under Horgan occasionally led the Liberals in polls. The May 9 election returned 43 Liberal MLAs, 41 NDP MLAs and a record 3 Green MLAs. This was one of the closest elections in BC's history, exemplified by the popular vote breakdown: 40.36% for the Liberals, 40.28% for the NDP, and 16.84% for the Greens. The Liberals won the popular vote by a razor-thin margin of just 1,566 votes province-wide. Following the election, the Greens entered into negotiations with both the Liberals and NDP to decide which party they should support in the minority parliament. On May 29, Horgan and Green leader Andrew Weaver announced that the Greens would support an NDP minority government in a confidence and supply agreement. This meant the Greens are obliged to vote with the NDP in matters of confidence – keeping the government from falling – but were allowed to vote freely on legislation brought forward by the NDP government. On June 29, the minority Liberal government of Premier Christy Clark was defeated 44–42 by the NDP-Green alliance in a confidence vote, leading Lieutenant Governor Judith Guichon to ask Horgan to form a government, making him British Columbia's 36th premier and first NDP premier in 16 years; the NDP formed a minority government, the first time the NDP has had such a government in provincial history.

In 2020, the NDP won a majority government, securing a record 57 seats and receiving 47.7% of the overall popular vote. After five years of being premier, Horgan announced in June 2022 that he would step down as party leader and as premier once a new leader had been chosen. The election for his successor was scheduled for the fourth quarter of 2022. David Eby was acclaimed as Horgan's successor on October 21, 2022, after the disqualification of the only other candidate, Anjali Appadurai, from the leadership contest.

Leaders

"" denotes acting or interim leader.

CCF

NDP

Election results

Results shown are for CCF from 1933–1960, NDP since 1963.

Current MLAs
, the following individuals serve as NDP MLAs:

See also
List of articles about British Columbia CCF/NDP members
British Columbia New Democratic Party leadership conventions
List of premiers of British Columbia
List of British Columbia general elections
List of political parties in British Columbia

Notes

References

External links
BC NDP site

 
Organizations based in Vancouver
Political parties established in 1933
New Democratic Party
Social democratic parties in Canada
New Democratic Party